Xigong is a transliteration of the Chinese words  or , may refer to:

 Xigong District, in Luoyang, Henan, China
 Ho Chi Minh City

See also
 Sai Kung (disambiguation), areas that named after Sai Kung in Hong Kong